is a serial UNESCO World Heritage Site consisting of 17 Jōmon-period archaeological sites in Hokkaidō and northern Tōhoku, Japan. The Jōmon period lasted more than 10,000 years, representing "sedentary pre-agricultural lifeways and a complex spiritual culture of prehistoric people". 

It was first placed on the World Heritage Tentative List in 2009. In 2021, ICOMOS recommended the inscription in July of the revised serial nomination of seventeen sites under criteria iii and v. It was then officially inscribed on the World Heritage List on 27 July 2021.

Sites
All component sites have been designated for protection under the Law for the Protection of Cultural Properties, as Historic Sites or *Special Historic Sites ("ACA" column below'').

See also

 List of National Treasures of Japan (archaeological materials)
 List of Historic Sites of Japan (Hokkaidō)
 List of Historic Sites of Japan (Aomori)
 List of Historic Sites of Japan (Iwate)
 List of Historic Sites of Japan (Akita)
 World Heritage Sites in Japan

References

External links
 Jōmon Prehistoric Sites in Northern Japan

Jōmon period
Archaeology of Japan
History of Hokkaido
Tōhoku region
World Heritage Sites in Japan